Yankee Doodle Dandy was a hamburger restaurant chain started in Bensenville, Illinois in December 1966 by brothers Chris and Bill Proyce as the Yankee Doodle House. The chain had as many as 27 restaurants, 7 company owned and the rest franchised, in the Chicago area by 1976.  Yankee Doodle had restaurants on 125th and Burleigh streets in Brookfield, Wis. and at 1119 N. La Grange Road in La Grange Park, Illinois during the 1970s. (The La Grange Park site is now a dry cleaner.) The buildings had a red, white and blue motif. Their slogan in the early 1970s was "Come On Down Where The Good Times Are! Yankee Doodle Dandy!" Their T.V. ads featured an attractive woman in a 1776 "Betsy Ross" style costume.    The restaurant had a design and menu similar to Burger Chef and Burger King. According to some sources, the chain went out of business in the early 1980s.

Starting in 1981, the Proyce family decide to withdraw from the fast food industry and refocus their efforts in casual dining restaurant and bar industry through the conversion of two of the company owned Yankee Doodles in Elmhurst and Arlington Heights into the new Bailey's Restaurant & Bar concept while closing the rest of the fast food operations. Eventually a total of four Bailey's Restaurant & Bar were opened by 1988. The last remaining Bailey's Restaurant & Bar (as of Aug. 2020)  is at 17731 Oak Park Ave. #A, Tinley Park, Illinois

See also
 List of defunct fast-food restaurant chains
 List of defunct restaurants of the United States

References

External links
 Yankee Doodle Dandy TV Commercial

Restaurants in Illinois
Defunct restaurant chains in the United States
Restaurants established in 1966
Fast-food franchises
1966 establishments in Illinois